Matthew H. Tennant (born March 19, 1987) is a former American football center for  the National Football League. He attended Boston College. Tennant was considered one of the best centers available for the 2010 NFL Draft. He was selected by the New Orleans Saints in the 5th round with the 158th overall selection, and played with the Saints for two years.

High school career
Tennant attended Moeller High School in Cincinnati, Ohio, where he was a three-year starter on the offensive line and senior team captain. He gained Associated Press All-State second-team honors and was named a 2004 All-American by SuperPrep.

Considered a three-star recruit by Rivals.com, Tennant was listed as the No. 55 offensive guard prospect in the nation in 2005. He chose Boston College over offers from Indiana, Kentucky, Penn State, and Purdue.

College career
After redshirting his initial year at Boston College, Tennant saw action in five games in the 2006 season. In his sophomore season, Tennant succeeded Kevin Sheridan as the Eagles' center. He started all 14 games for the Eagles in 2007 and helped the team to finish with 5,924 yards of total offense, while quarterback Matt Ryan passed for 4,507 yards.

As a junior, Tennant remained BC's starting center and played in all 14 games. The Eagles' line allowed only 21 quarterback sacks with a pair of first-year starting quarterbacks behind them. Tennant's performance earned him an All-ACC honorable mention.

Prior to his senior season, Tennant was voted a team captain. He started all games for the Eagles and anchored an offensive line that ranked 35th in the country in sacks allowed (1.42). He subsequently earned Second-team All-American honors by the Walter Camp Foundation.

Professional career

2010 NFL Draft
Projected as a second-round selection by Sports Illustrated, Tennant was ranked as the No. 2 available in the 2010 NFL Draft, behind only Maurkice Pouncey. He was drafted by the Saints in the fifth round.

New Orleans Saints
Tennant signed a four-year contract with the Saints on July 22, 2010. He was cut in 2012.

New England Patriots
Tennant was claimed off waivers by the New England Patriots on September 1, 2012, but was cut on September 4 when the Patriots needed to make room on the roster for running back Lex Hilliard. Tennant was again signed by New England as an emergency depth option because of the injuries to Guard Logan Mankins and Tackle Nick McDonald.

Tennant was released by the Patriots on October 20, 2012.

Philadelphia Eagles
Tennant was signed by the Philadelphia Eagles on October 23, 2012, after the Eagles released center Steve Vallos, who replaced injured starting center Jason Kelce. He was released on August 30, 2013.

References

External links
New Orleans Saints bio
Boston College Eagles bio

1987 births
Living people
Players of American football from Cincinnati
American football centers
Boston College Eagles football players
New Orleans Saints players
New England Patriots players
Philadelphia Eagles players